Equatorial Guinea elects on the national level a head of state – the president – and a legislature. The president is elected for a seven-year term by the people. President Teodoro Obiang Nguema Mbasogo was re-elected unopposed on 15 December 2002. The Chamber of People's Representatives (Cámara de Representantes del Pueblo) has 100 members, elected for a five-year term by proportional representation in multi-member constituencies.

Equatorial Guinea is a dominant-party state. This means that only one political party, the Democratic Party of Equatorial Guinea (PDGE), is de facto allowed to hold effective power.  Although minor parties are de jure allowed to rule, they are de facto required to accept the leadership of the dominant party.

Latest elections

Presidential elections

Parliamentary elections

Chamber of Deputies

Senate

See also
 Electoral calendar
 Electoral system

References

External links
Adam Carr's Election Archive
African Elections Database
IFES Election Guide